The Powlett River (Boonwurrung: Kugerungmome) is a perennial river of the West Gippsland catchment, located in the West Gippsland region of the Australian state of Victoria.

Location and features
The river descends  over its  course.

The river is traversed by the Bass Highway between Daylston and Wonthaggi.

Etymology
In the Aboriginal Boonwurrung language the name for the river is Kugerungmome, with no clearly defined meaning.

The river was named in 1840 in honour of Frederick Powlett, the Commissioner of the Western Port District.

See also

 Rivers of Victoria

References

External links

 

West Gippsland catchment
Rivers of Gippsland (region)
Western Port